This is a list of the Australian moth species of the family Elachistidae. It also acts as an index to the species articles and forms part of the full List of moths of Australia.

Genus Elachista
Subgenus Atachia Wocke, 1876
erebophthalma group
Elachista erebophthalma Meyrick, 1897
Elachista evexa Kaila, 2011
Elachista rhomboidea Kaila, 2011
Elachista leucastra (Meyrick, 1906)
gerasmia group, catarata section
Elachista menura Kaila, 2011
Elachista flammula Kaila, 2011
Elachista crocospila Kaila, 2011
Elachista glomerella Kaila, 2011
Elachista sphaerella Kaila, 2011
Elachista aluta Kaila, 2011
Elachista  sphaerella A (south-eastern Queensland)
Elachista sp. nr. sphaerella B (south-eastern Queensland)
Elachista sp. nr. sphaerella C (northern Queensland)
Elachista sp. nr. sphaerella D (northern Queensland)
Elachista sapphirella Kaila, 2011
Elachista patersoniae Kaila, 2011
Elachista catarata Meyrick, 1897
Elachista mutarata Kaila, 2011
Elachista laterina Kaila, 2011
Elachista ictera Kaila, 2011
Elachista asperae Kaila, 2011
Elachista ophthalma Kaila, 2011
Elachista coalita Kaila, 2011
Elachista corneola Kaila, 2011
gerasmia group, gerasmia section
Elachista magidina Kaila, 2011
Elachista floccella Kaila, 2011
Elachista velutina Kaila, 2011
Elachista carcharota Kaila, 2011
Elachista crenatella Kaila, 2011
Elachista bidens Kaila, 2011
Elachista alampeta Kaila, 2011
Elachista cursa Kaila, 2011
Elachista eriodes Kaila, 2011
Elachista illota Kaila, 2011
Elachista ceratiola Kaila, 2011
Elachista bilobella Kaila, 2011
Elachista filiphila Kaila, 2011
Elachista merista Kaila, 2011
Elachista lopadina Kaila, 2011
Elachista patania Kaila, 2011
Elachista indigens Kaila, 2011
Elachista sp. nr. indigens (Barren Grounds, New South Wales)
Elachista averta Kaila, 2011
Elachista anolba Kaila, 2011
Elachista flavicilia Kaila, 2011
Elachista tetraquetri Kaila, 2011
Elachista effusi Kaila, 2011
Elachista deusta Kaila, 2011
Elachista rubiginosae Kaila, 2011
Elachista ophelma Kaila, 2011
Elachista catagma Kaila, 2011
Elachista ruscella Kaila, 2011
Elachista sarota Kaila, 2011
Elachista syntomella Kaila, 2011
Elachista scopulina Kaila, 2011
Elachista nodosae Kaila, 2011
Elachista discina Kaila, 2011
Elachista melanthes (Meyrick, 1887)
Elachista platysma Kaila, 2011
Elachista stictifica Kaila, 2011
Elachista lachnella Kaila, 2011
Elachista sp. A in melanthes complex
gerasmia group, gerasmia section, Elachista gerasmia complex
Elachista gerasmia Meyrick, 1889 (Syn: Elachista egena Turner, 1923)
Elachista physalodes Kaila, 2011
Elachista peridiola Kaila, 2011
Elachista phascola Kaila, 2011
gerasmia group, gerasmia section, Elachista paragauda complex
Elachista paragauda Kaila, 2011
Elachista toralis Kaila, 2011
Elachista paryphoea Kaila, 2011
Elachista spathacea Kaila, 2011
Elachista cylistica Kaila, 2011
Elachista fabarella Kaila, 2011
Elachista etorella Kaila, 2011
Elachista gladiograpta Kaila, 2011
Elachista gladiatrix Kaila, 2011
Elachista spongicola Kaila, 2011
gerasmia group, gerasmia section, Elachista cynopa complex
Elachista ligula Kaila, 2011
Elachista toryna Kaila, 2011
Elachista ascidiella Kaila, 2011
Elachista repanda Kaila, 2011
Elachista prolatella Kaila, 2011
Elachista protensa Kaila, 2011
Elachista campsella Kaila, 2011
Elachista spinodora Kaila, 2011
Elachista glossina Kaila, 2011
Elachista opima Kaila, 2011
Elachista pharetra Kaila, 2011
Elachista rudicula Kaila, 2011
Elachista corbicula Kaila, 2011
Elachista mystropa Kaila, 2011
Elachista trulla Kaila, 2011
Elachista euthema Kaila, 2011
Elachista cynopa Meyrick, 1897
Elachista epartica Kaila, 2011
Elachista zeta Kaila, 2011
Elachista chilotera Kaila, 2011
Elachista mundula Kaila, 2011
Elachista listrionea Kaila, 2011
Elachista crumilla Kaila, 2011
Elachista aposematica Kaila, 2011
Elachista chloropepla Meyrick, 1897
Subgenus Elachista
Elachista tetragonella group
Elachista ensifera Kaila, 2011
Elachista bifascialla group s.l.
Elachista platina Kaila, 2011
Elachista sp. nr. platina (Corrigin, Western Australia)
Elachista sp. bifascialla group (Mount Barrow, Tasmania)
Elachista micalis Kaila, 2011
Elachista habrella Kaila, 2011
Elachista scitula Kaila, 2011
Elachista orba group
Elachista cyanea Kaila, 2011
Elachista polliae Kaila, 2011
Elachista commoncommelinae Sugisima & Kaira, 2011
Elachista nielsencommelinae Sugisima & Kaira, 2011
Elachista praelineata group
Elachista aurita Kaila, 2011
Elachista solena group
Elachista ignicolor Kaila, 2011
Elachista freyerella group s.l.
Elachista synethes complex
Elachista fucosa Meyrick, 1922
Elachista seductilis Kaila, 2011
Elachista synethes Meyrick, 1897 (Syn: Elachista aphanta Turner, 1923, Elachista scrythrodes (Turner, 1947))
Elachista strenua Kaila, 2011
Elachista sandaraca Kaila, 2011
Elachista helvola Kaila, 2011
Elachista delira Kaila, 2011
Elachista sp. in synethes complex
Elachista freyerella complex
Elachista propera Kaila, 2011
Elachista dieropa Kaila, 2011
Elachista elaphria Kaila, 2011
Elachista cycotis Meyrick, 1897
Elachista vitellina Kaila, 2011
Elachista citrina Kaila, 2011
Elachista cerebrosella Kaila, 2011
Elachista melina Kaila, 2011
Elachista gemadella Kaila, 2011
Elachista ravella Kaila, 2011
Elachista cerina Kaila, 2011
Elachista diligens Kaila, 2011
Elachista aepsera Kaila, 2011
Elachista zophosema (Turner, 1947)
Elachista litharga Kaila, 2011
Elachista levipes Kaila, 2011
Elachista cerrita Kaila, 2011
Elachista velox Kaila, 2011
Elachista impiger Kaila, 2011
Elachista alacera Kaila, 2011
Elachista essymena Kaila, 2011
Elachista festina Kaila, 2011
Genus Urodeta
Urodeta inusta Kaila, 2011
Genus Perittia
Perittia daleris Kaila, 2011
Perittia antauges Kaila, 2011
Perittia deroga Kaila, 2011

External links 
Elachistidae at Australian Faunal Directory
Elachistine Moths of Australia: Lepidoptera, Gelechioidea, Elachistidae

Australia